"You" is a song by the American heavy metal band Queensrÿche. It was released as a single in support of their 1997 album Hear in the Now Frontier.

Charts

References 

1996 songs
1997 singles
Queensrÿche songs
EMI Records singles
Songs written by Chris DeGarmo
Songs written by Geoff Tate
Song recordings produced by Peter Collins (record producer)
American hard rock songs